Herse , or Jupiter L, previously known by its provisional designation of , is a natural satellite of Jupiter. It was discovered on 8 February 2003 by the astronomers Brett J. Gladman, John J. Kavelaars, Jean-Marc Petit, and Lynne Allen and also by a team of astronomers at the University of Hawaii. It was named after Herse 'dew', by some accounts a daughter of Zeus and Selene the moon in Greek mythology, on 11 November 2009. Ersa (Jupiter LXXI) is also named for the same mythological figure.

Herse is about 2 kilometres in diameter, and orbits Jupiter at an average distance of 22,134,000 km in 672.752 days, at a mean inclination of 165° to the ecliptic, in a retrograde direction and with a mean eccentricity of 0.2493.

It is a member of the Carme group, made up of irregular retrograde moons orbiting Jupiter at a distance ranging between 23 and 24 Gm and at an inclination of about 165°.

References 

Carme group
Moons of Jupiter
Irregular satellites
Discoveries by Brett J. Gladman
Discoveries by John J. Kavelaars
Discoveries by Jean-Marc Petit
20030208
Moons with a retrograde orbit